Chunshen is a railway station on the Jinshan railway in Songjiang District, Shanghai. It opened for intercity passenger service on September 28, 2012.

References 

Railway stations in Shanghai
Railway stations in China opened in 2012
Stations on the Shanghai–Kunming Railway
Stations on the Jinshan railway